Helena Bertha Grace "Lena" Rice (21 June 1866 – 21 June 1907) was an Irish tennis player (then a British home nation) who won the singles title at the 1890 Wimbledon Championships. She is to date the only female player from Ireland ever to win a singles title at Wimbledon.

Biography 
Lena Rice was born the second-youngest of the eight children of Spring Rice and Anna Gorde in 1866. Her family lived in a two-storied Georgian building at Marlhill, half a mile from New Inn, County Tipperary. When her father died in 1868, her mother struggled to manage the household. Lena learned to play tennis with her sister Anne in their large garden at Marlhill, and both girls entered the Cahir Lawn Tennis club.

Rice's first tournament outside County Tipperary were the Irish Championships at Dublin in May 1889. There she lost in straight sets to Blanche Bingley Hillyard in the semifinals. In doubles competition, she reached the final partnering Hillyard, and in mixed doubles she won the title along with Willoughby Hamilton.

Later that year, Rice played at the Wimbledon Championships. She reached the final where she met Hillyard once again. She won the first set 6–4 and had three match points at 5–3, 40–15 and advantage in the second, but Hillyard managed to come back and eventually won 4–6, 8–6, 6–4.

The next year, only four players participated at the singles event at Wimbledon. After winning over Mary Steedman in two sets in the first round, her opponent in the All-comers' final was May Jacks. Rice won 6–4, 6–1 and as defending champion Blanche Hillyard was pregnant and did not enter the tournament, Rice won the title, the 50-guineas challenger trophy and a cash prize of 20 guineas.

She is credited with inventing the Overhead Smash, employing it in her match-winning point against May Jacks in that 1890 final.

After her 1890 Wimbledon title, there is no record of Rice playing tennis at a tournament. She did not defend her Wimbledon title in the challenge round the following year. As her mother died in 1891, it seems likely that family ill health prevented her from continuing her tennis career.

Rice, who never married, died of tuberculosis on her 41st birthday in 1907. She was buried at the New Inn cemetery, close to her parents, her brother Samuel and their father's sister Agnes.

Grand Slam finals

Singles (1 title)

References 

19th-century female tennis players
19th-century Irish people
British female tennis players
Irish female tennis players
Sportspeople from County Tipperary
Wimbledon champions (pre-Open Era)
1866 births
1907 deaths
Grand Slam (tennis) champions in women's singles
20th-century deaths from tuberculosis
Tuberculosis deaths in Ireland